Dashrath is a given name. It may refer to:

Dashrath Chand (1903-1941) Nepalese politician, martyr of Nepalese Democratic Movement
Dashrath Gagrai, Indian politician and member of Jharkhand Legislative Assembly
Dashrath Patel (1927–2010), Indian designer, sculptor

See also
Dashrath Puri, a small colony situated on Dabri-Palam road in South West Delhi, India